Lazzaro Opizio Pallavicini or Pallavicino (30 October 1719 – 23 February 1785) was a cardinal of the Catholic Church starting in 26 September 1766. 

He was born in Genoa, Italy. He was the nephew of Cardinal Lazzaro Pallavicino (1602-1680). 

He was ordained a priest in 1754. He served as Apostolic Nuncio to the Kingdom of Naples from 1754 to 1859 and as Nuncio to Spain from 1760 to 1767. In 1769, Pope Clement XIV named him Secretary of State. He participated in the papal conclaves of 1769, 1774, and 1775.

References

1719 births
1785 deaths
Clergy from Genoa
Apostolic Nuncios to Spain
18th-century Italian cardinals